All the Rage is the twentieth album by country and bluegrass singer Rhonda Vincent. It is Vincent's third live release and her second (following 2005 album Ragin' Live) to give her backing band The Rage star billing alongside her. Released on November 11, 2016 by Vincent's own record label Upper Management Music, All the Rage reached number one on the Billboard Top Bluegrass Albums chart, her seventh album to do so. It was recorded at Bethel University in McKenzie, Tennessee.

The album won Vincent her first Grammy Award for Best Bluegrass Album at the 60th Annual Grammy Awards following six previous nominations as well as the first win for all five members of The Rage (following their one previous nomination for Ragin' Live). In a first for the Best Bluegrass Album category, All the Rage tied with Laws of Gravity by The Infamous Stringdusters for the most votes, with both acts receiving Grammys.

Track listing

Chart performance

Credits 
Courtesy of Discogs.

The Rage
Rhonda Vincent - lead vocals, mandolin, guitar
Hunter Berry - fiddle, mandolin
Brent Burke - dobro
Mickey Harris - bass, backing vocals
Aaron McDaris - banjo, guitar
Josh Williams - guitar, mandolin, backing vocals

References 

2016 albums
Grammy Award for Best Bluegrass Album
Bluegrass albums
Rhonda Vincent albums